Sairol bin Haji Sahari (born 9 April 1983) is a Bruneian retired footballer who played as a defender. He is currently an assistant coach at Kasuka FC.

Club career

Sairol began his career as a young left-sided midfielder for the Brunei team which played in the Malaysian league system. After leaving the country's representative side in 2004, he helped NBT FC gain promotion to the domestic top flight, serving as captain. He moved to DPMM FC in 2006 when the club had entered the Malaysia Premier League in Brunei FA's place. He was sent on loan to Indera SC in 2010 while DPMM was prevented from playing in the S.League due to a FIFA suspension of Brunei.

On 25 April 2016, Sairol suffered an anterior cruciate ligament injury in training and was absent for the remaining 2016 S.League season.

Sairol has since joined Kasuka FC as assistant coach for the 2017 Brunei Super League, with a view to returning to action in the next year. He registered as a player for Kasuka for the 2018-19 season and has impressed since, scoring against Najip-BAKES and Indera SC.

Sairol led Kasuka all the way to the final of the 2022 Brunei FA Cup where they were beaten by his former club DPMM FC 2–1 on 4 December. That was to be his final game of his illustrious career.

International career
Still 18 years of age, Sairol was chosen to represent Brunei at the 2001 SEA Games held in Kuala Lumpur, and made his sole appearance against the hosts and only lasting about half-an-hour. Sairol then played for the under-21s at the 2002 and 2005 Hassanal Bolkiah Trophy.

Sairol made his international debut for the Wasps in 2008 (he was an unused substitute in the 2004 Asian Cup qualifying matches), when his club side DPMM was sent as the nation's representatives at the 2008 AFF Suzuki Cup qualification held in Cambodia. Brunei failed to qualify after one win and one draw. He was picked for the next two qualification rounds in 2012 and 2014.

In May 2019 Sairol was recalled to the national team by Robbie Servais for the two-legged 2022 World Cup qualification games, five years since his last involvement with the Wasps. He was appointed captain of the team and started at centre-back for both home and away against Mongolia. Brunei were beaten 2–3 on aggregate and thus failed to qualify to the next round.

Honours

Team
Brunei DPMM FC
 S.League: 2012 Runner-Up, 2014 Runner-Up, 2015
 Singapore League Cup (3): 2009, 2012, 2014

References

External links

Living people
1983 births
Association football defenders
Bruneian footballers
Brunei international footballers
DPMM FC players
Indera SC players
Brunei (Malaysia Premier League team) players
Competitors at the 2001 Southeast Asian Games
Southeast Asian Games competitors for Brunei